is a Japanese professional footballer who plays as a winger or a forward for  club FC Tokyo.

Club career

Early career 
Born in Kanagawa, Nakagawa was educated at and played for Senshu University prior to joining Yokohama F. Marinos. In 2013, as the third-year student, he became the top scorer of the year with 15 goals in the JUFA-Kanto Division I League. And also selected as National team for Universiade Kazan, therefore he was described as the best player in the League.

On 19 October 2014, he seriously injured his right knee, ACL, MCL and meniscus. Even though this injury forced him to end the season, it was not known when he would recover, but Marinos officially announced his joining on 28 October.

Yokohama F. Marinos 
In August 2015, Nakagawa was fully recovered from his injury. On 6 September, he made his debut for Yokohama F. Marinos in Emperor's Cup against MIO Biwako Shiga. And September 12, he made his debut in J1 League against Albirex Niigata.

On 25 May 2016, he scored his first goal in Marinos in J.League Cup against Albirex Niigata.

Machida Zelvia 
On 6 September 2016, Nakagawa was loaned to Machida Zelvia. On 11 September, he made his debut in Zelvia. On 18 September, he scored his first goal in Zelvia in J2 League against Zweigen Kanazawa. During this season, he scored 3 goals in 12 games.

Yokohama F. Marinos 
On 12 January 2017, Nakagawa returned to Yokohama F. Marinos.

Avispa Fukuoka 
On 24 July 2017, Nakagawa was loaned to Avispa Fukuoka. During this season, he played in 18 games.

Yokohama F. Marinos 
On 12 January 2018, Nakagawa returned to Yokohama F. Marinos again. On 19 May, he scored 2 goals in one game against V-Varen Nagasaki. On 29 September, he scored an excellent goal which honored as the best goal for this month. He received the ball behind the halfway line, ran 40 meters and get the ball past the defender with a skillful nutmeg before scoring.

From 2019 he chose to use the number 23 at Yokohama F. Marinos the Nissan brand is that the brand only uses the number 23 in its cars for motorsport competitions. The reason? In Japanese, "Ni" is number two and "San" is number three. and he got the nickname Nissan GT-R because of his speed

On 3 May 2019, he scored first goal in Reiwa, the new era of Japan, against Sanfrecce Hiroshima. On 9 November, he scored incredible goal again in J1 League against Consadole Sapporo after he was chosen MVP for October 2019. He collected the ball near the center mark, dribbled 50 meters and past four defenders including goalkeeper before scoring, and the ball was gently passed to open goal.

FC Tokyo 
In November 2022, it was announced that Nakagawa would be leaving Yokohama F. Marinos to join FC Tokyo.

Personal life 
In parents' home, Nakagawa has a poodle called Ray, and the origin of the dog's name is Teruhito, Nakagawa's first name. "Teru" of Teruhito is the Japanese word for "to shine" and has the same meaning as "Ray".

Club statistics

National team statistics

Honours

Club 
Yokohama F. Marinos
 J1 League: 2019, 2022

Individual 
 J.League Most Valuable Player: 2019
 J.League Top Scorer: 2019
 J.League Best XI: 2019

References

External links

Profile at Yokohama F. Marinos
Profile at Machida Zelvia
 
 

1992 births
Living people
Senshu University alumni
Association football people from Kanagawa Prefecture
Japanese footballers
J1 League players
J2 League players
Yokohama F. Marinos players
FC Machida Zelvia players
Avispa Fukuoka players
FC Tokyo players
Association football forwards
Universiade bronze medalists for Japan
Universiade medalists in football
J1 League Player of the Year winners
Medalists at the 2013 Summer Universiade
Japan international footballers